"Hangin'" is a single from the sixth studio album by the Chic, Tongue in Chic.

It was the first single from this album and it reached #64 on the UK singles chart in March 1983, spending 1 week on the chart. It was Chic's first chart position in the UK for three and a half years. It just failed to enter US Billboard R&B chart top 40 (peaked at #48).

Billboard said that "street feel is the main suit here, starting with spoken banter and slipping into the crisply syncopated arrangement."

Track listing
Atlantic 7" 89954 October 12, 1982
 A. "Hangin'" (7" Edit) - 3:35
 B. "City Lights" - 4:26

Atlantic promo 12" DMD 371, 1982
 A. "Hangin'" - 5:13
 B. "Hangin'" (7" Edit) - 3:35

References

1982 singles
Chic (band) songs
Songs written by Bernard Edwards
Songs written by Nile Rodgers
Song recordings produced by Nile Rodgers
Song recordings produced by Bernard Edwards
1982 songs